Diari aperti is the tenth studio album by Italian singer Elisa, released by Universal Music Group on 26 October 2018. The singer's first concept album, it is her second album released entirely in Italian after L'anima vola (2013).

Ranked 10th of the "50 Best Italian Albums of 2010s" by Rolling Stone Italia, in 2019 the project was reissued in a double album, Diari aperti (Segreti svelati), composed of the first disc with Italian songs and the second with the English songs already released on the EP Secret Diaries, alongside new bonus tracks and collaborations with Francesco De Gregori, Carmen Consoli, Rkomi, Carl Brave and Calcutta. 

The album debuted at number two on the FIMI Albums Chart and was certified three times platinum in Italy.

Background
After ending her contract with Sugar Music, Elisa signed with Universal Music Group in February 2017. On 12 October 2018 she announced "Diari aperti", her second album entirely in Italian, and an acoustic tour to accompany its release. From March 2019 to May 2019 she embarked on a European tournée to promote the album.

Composition 

The recording project includes eleven tracks in Italian, written and composed by Elisa, with contributions from Davide Petrella, Federica Abbate, Calcutta and Carl Brave, and the vocal participation of Francesco De Gregori. American musician and composer Patrick Warren collaborates for arrangements of the tracks. The singer defined the record project a concept album, in which she reflects about her life, marriage and feelings.

Singles 
"Quelli che restano", featuring Francesco De Gregori, was released as the lead single from the album on 14 September 2018. "Se piovesse il tuo nome" was released as the second single on 28 September 2018.
The song peaked at number 4 on the Italian Singles Chart and was awarded double platinum from the Federazione Industria Musicale Italiana.

During 2019 "Anche fragile", a new version of "Vivere tutte le vite" featuring rapper Carl Brave and "Tua per sempre" were all released as singles from the album; the first two were certified double platinum in Italy while the third one was certified gold. The track "Promettimi", without being a single, was certified platinum.

Critical reception 

Diari aperti received positive reviews from music critics. Writing for Rockol, Mattia Marzi opined that the album "represents at the same time a way to take stock and open up to news, to reflect on how many pages have been written and on how much there is still to be written", praising the vulnerable side of the singer and her singing versatility in several music genres.

Track listing

Diari aperti (Segreti svelati)

Commercial success 
Diari aperti debuted at number two on the FIMI Albums Chart, becoming the artist's thirteenth top ten album on the chart, third number two of her career after Lotus (2003) and Pearl Days (2004). On December 5, 2018, the album was certified as a gold by FIMI, becoming the 34th best-selling album of 2018. On February 29, 2019, the album was certified platinum for selling over 50,000 units. 

In 2019, after the release of the reissue Diari aperti (Segreti svelati), the project returned to the top ten of FIMI's chart at number six, becoming the eighteenth best-selling album of the year. In 2020, the album achieved double platinum status, appearing on both the 2020 and 2021 FIMI End-Year Charts. In 2022, it was certified triple platinum with 150,000 units sold.

Charts

Weekly charts

Year-end charts

Certifications

References

Album chart usages for Switzerland
2018 albums
Elisa (Italian singer) albums